Metz Handball is a French handball club from Metz, France. Founded in 1965 under the name ASPTT Metz, the club has an exceptional track record with some 40 titles won, which is the all-time record for a French women's team sport. Chaired by Thierry Weizman since 2005, the club is becoming increasingly professional and now aims to play a leading role in Europe.

The men's team also played in 1st League between 1971 and 1983, and nowadays plays in Nationale 1 (3rd division) since 2020.

History
If Metz Handball has become over the last decades the most prestigious women's handball club in France, it is also one of the oldest institutions playing in the French elite.

The club was created in 1965 under the name of ASPTT Metz, but it will be necessary to wait a few more years to see the creation of a feminine team in 1968, which make the current fame of the club.

Vice-champions of France and semi-finalists of the Cup of Cups in 1977, the men's team gave ASPTT Metz its first prestige. But in the shadow, the women's team progressed year after year until being promoted in 1986 in the best league in France, without ever leaving it since. The coach of the team at that time was French Olivier Krumbholz, who later became the successful national manager for France. 
Since the promotion, Metz HB has had overwhelming success with 24 National Championships from 1989 to 2022, which is the all-time record in the French Women's First League Championship.

Metz Handball is progressively establishing itself as a strong place in European handball. A first epic saw the Dragonnes reach the semi-final of the Cup Winners Cup in 1999. They then became famous in the EHF Cup where, after several quarter finals, they played a first European final in 2013 but did not manage to win the title. The following seasons, the club gains momentum and shines in the Champions League. Unlucky quarter-finalists in 2017 and 2018, Metz participated for the first time in the Final 4 of Europe's most prestigious competition in 2019, where they finished fourth.

After a season without any trophy in 2021, Metz Handball realizes the most beautiful season of its history. The club won a 24th French Championship title, a 10th French Cup, and became famous in the Ligue Butagaz Énergie with a flawless record: 26 victories in 26 games. For the second time in its history, the Dragonnes participated in the Final 4 of the EHF Champions League and won their first European medal by finishing third.

Name

 1967–2002: ASPTT Metz
 2002–2005: Handball Metz Métropole
 2005–2009: Handball Metz Moselle Lorraine
 2009–: Metz Handball

Results

French Women's First League Championship:
Winners (24): 1989, 1990, 1993, 1994, 1995, 1996, 1997, 1999, 2000, 2002, 2004, 2005, 2006, 2007, 2008, 2009, 2011, 2013, 2014, 2016, 2017, 2018, 2019, 2022
Runner-up (7): 1991, 1992, 1998, 2001, 2003, 2012, 2015, 2021
French Women's Cup Championship:
Winners (10): 1990, 1994, 1998, 1999, 2010, 2013, 2014, 2017, 2019, 2022
Runner-up (7): 1987, 1992, 1993, 2001, 2005, 2009, 2018
French Women's League Cup Championship:
Winners (7): 2005, 2006, 2007, 2008, 2009, 2010, 2011, 2014
Runner-up (1): 2004
European Women's EHF Cup:
Silver: 2013
European Women's EHF Cup Winners' Cup:
Semi-finalist: 1999, 2004, 2010, 2011
European EHF Women's Champions League:
Bronze: 2022
Quarterfinalists: 2017, 2018, 2021
Fourth place: 2019

European record

Team

Current squad
Squad for the season 2022–23

Goalkeepers
 1  Camille Depuiset
 99  Hatadou Sako
Wingers
LW
 6  Chloé Valentini
 21  Laura Kanor
RW
 14  Debbie Bont 
 70  Julie Leblevec 
PV
 27  Sarah Bouktit 
 28  Noémie Barthélémy
 33  Luisa Schulze 

Back players
LB
 2  Bruna de Paula (c)
8   Ćamila Mičijević 
 26  Stelvia de Jesus Pascoal
CB
 10  Kristina Jørgensen 
 11  Tamara Horacek
RB
 19  Louise Burgaard
 24  Emma Jacques 
 61  Valeriia Maslova

Transfers

Transfers for the 2023–24 season

 Joining
 Lucie Granier (RW) (from  ESBF Besançon)
 Anne Mette Hansen (LB) (from  Győri Audi ETO KC) 
 Djazz Chambertin (LB/CB) (from  OGC Nice Côte d'Azur Handball) 
 Alina Grijseels (CB) (from  Borussia Dortmund Handball)

 Leaving
  Noémie Barthélémy (LP) (retires)
 Debbie Bont (RW) (retires)
 Tamara Horacek (CB) (to  Neptunes de Nantes)
 Bruna de Paula (LB/CB) (to  Győri Audi ETO KC)
 Laura Kanor (LW) (to  Rapid București)
 Valeriia Maslova (RB) (to  Brest Bretagne Handball) 
  Stelvia de Jesus Pascoal (LB)

Technical staff
Staff for the 2022–23 season.
 Head coach: Emmanuel Mayonnade
 Assistant coach: Yekaterina Andryushina
 Physicak coach: Nicolas Jarzat 
 Goalkeeping coach: Alexandra Hector 
 Physiotherapist: Alexandre Pawlowski
 Physiotherapist: Pierre Gilet
 Doctor: Thierry Weizman

Academy

Training Center

As of the 2022–23 season.

Goalkeepers
 16  Fatima Camara
 71  Mélanie Halter

Left Wingers
 23  Zaliata Mlamali
 25  Sarah Obry
 47  Fantine Philipps
Right Wingers
 42  Emma Tuccella
 98  Manon Errard
Line players
 3  Kenza Bougherch
 7  Merle Albers

Left Backs
 51  Lily Balássi 
 20  Laura Fauvarque
Centre Backs
 9  Délia Golvet
 17  Claire Koestner
Right Backs
 5  Andela Zagar
 15  Alice Monteillet
 29  Lalie Vernay

Men's team

As of the 2022–23 season.

Goalkeepers
 25  Hugo Bordy
 97  Nicolas Balmy

Left Wingers
 3  Thiebaud Marotta
 9  Geoffrey Bettenfeld
 57  Antonin D'hondt
Right Wingers
 19  Nathan Andrezo
 44  Xavier Blond
Line players
 15  Arthur Abate
 93  Médérick Grégoire

Left Backs
 7  Frederik Olsen 
 94  Romain Baumann
Centre Backs
 17  Adrien Goffin
 14  Guillaume Bettendfeld
Right Backs
 30  Steven Bello

Statistics

Top scorers in the EHF Champions League 
(All-Time) – Last updated on 16 February 2023

Individual awards in the EHF Champions League

Notable former players 

 Camille Ayglon
 Paule Baudouin
 Chloé Bulleux
 Cléopâtre Darleux
 Béatrice Edwige
 Laura Flippes
 Laura Glauser
 Tamara Horacek
 Manon Houette
/ Melinda Jacques-Szabó
 Nina Kamto Njitam
 
 Laurisa Landre
 Amandine Leynaud
 Marion Limal
 Stéphanie Ludwig
 Nodjialem Myaro
 Claudine Mendy
 Gnonsiane Niombla
 Allison Pineau
 Katty Piejos
 Linda Pradel
 Sophie Remiatte
 Maakan Tounkara
 Isabelle Wendling
 Grâce Zaadi
 Justina Praça
 Klaudija Bubalo
 Kristina Franić (Elez)
 Ivana Kapitanović
 
 Lenka Černá
 Lara González
 Xenia Smits
 Andrea Farkas
 Marina Vukčević (Rajčić) 
 Jurswailly Luciano
 Yvette Broch
 Ekaterina Andryushina
/ 
 Kristina Liščević
 Tatjana Medved
 Svetlana Ognjenović
 Slađana Pop-Lazić
 Ana Gros
 Olga Peredery

Head coach history

Stadium 

Name: Les Arènes
City: Metz
Capacity: 5,000
Address: 5 avenue Louis-le-Débonnaire 57000
Played in the arena since: 2001-

Kit manufacturers
 Kempa

References

External links
 

French handball clubs
Sport in Metz